Mithu may refer to:

 Mithu Alur (born 1943), Indian social worker
 Mithu Chakrabarty, Indian Bengali film and television actress
 Mithu Mukherjee (cricketer), former Indian cricketer
 Mithu Mukherjee (actress) (born 1953), former actress acting in Bengali and Hindi films
 Mithu Sen (born 1971), Indian conceptual artist

See also 
 Mitu (disambiguation)
 Mittu (disambiguation)
 Mitsu (disambiguation)